Ausculta Fili (Latin) is a papal bull addressed on 5 December 1301, by Pope Boniface VIII to King Philip IV of France.

Background
Philip, at enmity with Boniface, had aggressively expanded what he saw as royal rights by conferring benefices and appointing bishops to sees, regardless of papal authority. He drove from their sees bishops who were in opposition to his will and supported the Pope.

In 1295, Boniface created a see at Pamiers from the diocese of Toulouse by the bull Romanus Pontifex, made it a suffragan of the archdiocese of Narbonne and named Bernard Saisset as bishop. However, the opposition of Hughes Mascaron, Bishop of Toulouse, and the conflict between Saisset and Roger Bernard III, Count of Foix, prevented Saisset from taking immediate possession of his diocese. As an ardent Occitan aristocrat, Saisset made no secret of the fact that he despised the northern "Frankish" French.

In 1299, Boniface suspended two bishops in the south of France. Philip then attempted to exercise the droit de regale and claimed the right to seize the revenues of the vacant sees. Boniface objected that suspension is not the same as deposition and did not render a see vacant. He sent the Bishop of Pamiers to Philip as legate to protest.

Contents
The incipit is modeled on that of the Rule of St Benedict. The letter is couched in firm, paternal terms. It points out the alleged evils the king has brought to his kingdom, to church and to State and invites him to do penance and mend his ways.

Aftermath
It went unheeded by Philip and was followed by the papal bull Unam Sanctam.

References

Attribution

1301 works
History of Christianity in France
History of the papacy
14th-century papal bulls
Documents of Pope Boniface VIII
Latin texts
Philip IV of France
France–Holy See relations